Spin the Bottle is a 2003 Irish film directed by Ian Fitzgibbon.

Premise 
The film is a story about a man named Rats who tries to form a band after being released from Mountjoy Prison to get money for a pilgrimage to Lourdes.

Cast 
 Michael McElhatton
 Peter McDonald 
 Samantha Mumba 
 Bronagh Gallagher 
 Donal O'Kelly 
 Pat Leavy

The film features a short appearance by pop singer Samantha Mumba, in what was her second film role.

Awards and nominations
 2003 IFTA Award nomination, Best Actor-Film (Michael McElhatton)
 2003 IFTA Award nomination, Best Script (Ian Fitzgibbon and Michael McElhatton)

See also 
 Paths to Freedom

Notes

External links 
 

2004 films
Irish comedy films
2003 comedy films
2003 films
Films directed by Ian Fitzgibbon
2004 comedy films
2000s English-language films
Films set in Dublin (city)
Films shot in Dublin (city)